Bâton Rouge Steakhouse & Bar is a Canadian restaurant chain serving baby back ribs, Sterling Silver steaks, and grilled catch of the day.

History
It was founded in Laval, Quebec in 1992. The first restaurant is located at the Carrefour Laval.

The restaurant chain is now owned by MTY Food Group, after their purchase of former owner Imvescor Restaurant Group Inc. (formerly known as Imvescor Inc. / Pizza Delight Corporation Ltd.) based in Moncton. MTY also owns numerous other restaurant chains.

The first Bâton Rouge restaurant in Alberta was opened in July 2010 in Quarry Park, Calgary; closed in 2012, it reopened in 2013. There is also a location in Halifax, Nova Scotia.

See also
List of Canadian restaurant chains

References

Further reading

External links
Official website

Restaurants in Montreal
Restaurant chains in Canada
Restaurant franchises
1992 establishments in Quebec
Restaurants established in 1992